Basketball is the second most popular sport in Spain, directly behind association football. The top Spanish League, Liga ACB, is a member of ULEB, and the top Spanish League teams can compete in Europe, most notably in the Euroleague and Eurocup, and also under the FIBA Europe umbrella, in the FIBA Europe Cup. The Spanish teams also compete in a national domestic cup competition each year, called the Copa del Rey de Baloncesto, which is played by the top eight teams in the standings of the Liga ACB, at the end of the first half of the regular season.

Spanish basketball league system

The tier levels

Evolution of the Spanish basketball league system

Spanish women's basketball league system

Spain national basketball team

Men's team

Women's team

Autonomous teams 
Like in football, several Autonomous Communities have their own autonomous team. These teams are not recognized by FIBA Europe, and only play in friendly games.

Between 2008 and 2010, the Torneo de las Naciones was played between the teams of Basque Country, Catalonia, and Galicia, and a foreign national team was invited. The following Autonomous Communities have played at least one friendly game:

Also,  has got a basketball team which plays biennially in the Island Games.

On the other hand, Gibraltar has its own national team recognized by FIBA Europe.  plays biannually in the European Basketball Championship for Small Countries and, like Menorca, the Island Games.

Other competitions 
Copa del Rey de Baloncesto
Supercopa de España de Baloncesto
Copa Príncipe de Asturias

References

External links
Liga ACB Official Website 
Spanish Basketball Federation 
Basketball In Spain (In English)